Itkin is a male surname. Its feminine counterpart is Itkina. Notable people with the surname include:

David Itkin (born 1957), American conductor and composer
Ivan Itkin (1936–2020), American politician
Maria Itkina (1932–2020), Soviet Olympic runner
Nick Itkin (born 1999), American Olympic fencer, junior world champion